The Gulf of Santa Catalina, also the Gulf of Catalina, is a gulf in the Pacific Ocean on the west coast of North America. The eastern coast of the gulf belongs to the states of California, United States, and Baja California, Mexico. The biggest town on the shore of the gulf is San Diego. The islands in the gulf include Santa Catalina Island. The gulf is over 100 square miles big and borders the east coast of Catalina and the beaches of Orange County, Los Angeles County, and San Diego county.

The gulf is located in a seismically active area.

History
The gulf was first navigated by European discoverers in 1542, when Juan Rodríguez Cabrillo sailed there from Navidad on the San Salvador and two other ships.

References

Gulfs of the Pacific Ocean
Gulfs of the United States
Gulfs of Mexico
Bodies of water of California
Landforms of Southern California
Landforms of Baja California
Landforms of the Channel Islands of California
Santa Catalina Island (California)
Bodies of water of Los Angeles County, California
Bodies of water of Orange County, California
Bodies of water of San Diego County, California